Mi-Ke were an award-winning J-Pop idol group in the early 1990s.  Formed as the chorus group for B.B.Queens under Being Inc. recording agency, they had several singles which made the music charts, and released a number of albums.

Their music and onstage image were reminiscent of the 1960s.  They also did a number of cover versions of older songs (some in English, some as Japanese translations) from the Beach Boys and from British Invasion groups.

The name Mi-Ke is a Japanese phrase meaning "three colors," commonly used for multicolored cats.  Costumes used in performances usually featured different colors or styles.

Members
Keiko Utoku
Mami Watanabe
Haruka Murakami

Biography
In the 1990s, the group debuted as back-up chorus singers in the B.B.Queens band. On 14 February 1991, they debuted with the single Omoide no Kujuukurihama. The group later went onto to win the Rookie of the Year award at various award ceremonies, including the Golden Discs Award and Nihon Record Taishou. As the first Being Inc. artists, they made their first appearance on the NHK's end of the year program Kouhaku Uta Gassen. From 1992 April until 1993 March, they were regular members of the NHK program NHK Hit Stage with total 31 broadcasts. 

On August 1993 Keiko debuted as a soloist with single Anata no Yume no Naka Sotto Shinobikomitai. After the release of album Eien no Liverpool Sound ~ Please Please Me, Love, the group disappeared from the music scene, though Keiko continued to develop her solo career. There was never any announcement of the group disbanding or any kind of hiatus.

Post Disbandment
In 2011, during the 20th anniversary of their original debut, the third compilation album Mi-Ke Golden Hits: 20th Anniversary included two previously unreleased songs. In 2012, Keiko appeared with B.B.Queens during the live special Being Legends, where, along with solo songs, she performed Mi-ke's biggest hits as well. Keiko has been active as a solo singer as of late 2021. Haruka currently runs her blog about plants and Mami works as an independent singer under the alias, JanMei.

Discography

Singles
Omoide no Kujuukurihama (1991)
Sukisa Sukisa Sukisa (1991)
Blue Light Yokosuka (1991)
Mu~n na Kimochi wa Osenchi (1991)
Shiroi Shiroi Sangoshou (1991)
Kanashiki Teddy Boy (1992)
Surfing JAPAN (1992)
Asa Made Odorou (1992)
Pink Christmas (1992)
Namida no Vacation (1992)
Please Please Me, Love (1993)

Studio albums
Omoide no G S Kujuukurihama (1991)
Idakashi Blue Light Yokohama Yokosuka (1991)
Wasureji no Folk Shiroi Shiroi Sangoshou (1992)
Taiyou no Shimo no Surfing JAPAN (1992)
Asa Made Odorou Kanashiki Teddy Boy (1992)
Yomigaeru 60's Namida no Vacation (1993)
Eien no Liverpool Sound ~Please Please Me, LOVE (1993)

Compilation albums
complete of Mi-Ke at the BEING studio (2002)
BEST OF BEST 1000 Mi-Ke (2007)
Mi-Ke Golden Hits: 20th Anniversary (2011)

Awards
Japan Gold Disc Award 1992: Grand Prix New Artist, Best 5 New Artist
33rd Japan Record Awards: Best New Artist Award, New Artist Award (Nomination for the Best New Artist Award)
24th Japan Cable Awards: Best Newcomer Award

In-media usage
Omoide no Kujuukurihama was used as a theme song for TBS television series Nurse Station
Sukisa Sukisa Sukisa was used as an opening theme for NTV program N!Sanma
Blue Light Yokosuka was used as an ending theme for NTV Television quiz program Quiz Sekai Show by Jo-Bai!!
Mu~n na Kimochi wa Osenchi was used as an ending theme for Anime television series Obocchama kun!
Shiroi Shiroi Sangoshou was used as an ending theme for TV Asahi program Disney Time
Kanashiki Teddy Boy was used as an ending theme for NTV Television quiz program Quiz Sekai Show by Jo-Bai!!
Surfing Japan was used as a Snow Brand Milk Products commercial song of Tottemo Jelly 
Asa Made Odorou was used as an insert song for TBS television series Tenshi no you ni Ikitemitai
Pink Christmas was used as an ending theme for NTV Television quiz program Quiz Sekai Show by Jo-Bai!!
Namida no Vacation was used as a theme song for NHK Program NHK Hit Stage
Please Please Me, Love was used as a theme song for Fuji TV television series Aijou Monogatari

Television appearances

Music Station
Suki sa Suki sa Suki sa
Blue Light Yokosuka
Shiroi Shiroi Sangoshou
Kanashiki Teddy Boy
Surfing Japan
Asa Made Odorou
Pink Christmas (twice)
Namida no Vacation
Please, Please me Love

Kōhaku Uta Gassen
42nd: Omoide no Kujuu Kurihama 
43rd: Namida no Vacation

References

External links
Official Site
BeingGiza profile (WebArchived)

Japanese pop music groups
Living people
Being Inc. artists
Musical groups established in 1991
Musical groups disestablished in 1993
Year of birth missing (living people)